The Spanish surname Ruiz originates from the Germanic personal name "Hrodric" which is composed of the elements "Hrōd", meaning "renown", and "rīc", meaning "power(ful)", thus "famous ruler". Ruiz is a patronymic from the personal name Ruy, a short form of Rodrigo, meaning "son of Roderick". Its roots can be traced back to the Visigoths, the Germanic tribe which ruled in the Iberian Peninsula between the 5th and 8th centuries.

People 

 Adolfo Ruiz Cortines (1890–1973), President of Mexico 1952–1958
 Alejandro R. Ruiz (1923–2009), U.S. Army recipient of Medal of Honor in World War II
 Alexandre Ruiz (born 1987), French rugby union referee
 Andrés Ponce 'Andy' Ruiz Jr. (born 1989), American professional boxer of Mexican descent 
 Antoñito Ruiz (born 1951), Spanish child actor and stuntman
 Ashley Ruiz (born 1976), American singer, prior member of the group Menudo
 Bartolomé Ruiz (1482–1532), Spanish conquistador
 Blas Ruiz, Spanish explorer
 Brunilda Ruiz (1936–2019), American ballet dancer
 Bryan Ruiz (born 1985), Costa Rican football player
 Carlos Ruiz (disambiguation), several people
 Cesar Ruiz (disambiguation), several people
 Chela Ruiz (1921–1999), Argentine actress
 Chris Ruiz, German electronic DJ and producer, member of band And One
 David Resendez Ruíz (unk) Mexican-American prison activist known for Ruiz v. Estelle
 Edgar Humberto Ruiz (born 1971), Colombian road cyclist
 Enzo Ruiz (disambiguation), several people
 Estanislau Ruiz Ponsetti (1889–1967), Spanish engineer and socialist politician
 Estela Ruiz (born 1936), Mexican-American Marian visionary
 Esteury Ruiz (born 1999), Dominican baseball player
 Félix Ruiz (1940–1993), Spanish footballer
 Frankie Ruiz (1958–1998), Puerto Rican salsa singer 
 Gabriel Ruiz (disambiguation), several people
 Gabrielle Ruiz (born 1983), American actress
 Gonzalo Ruiz de Toledo, Spanish aristocrat
 Héctor Ruiz (born 1945), Mexican-American businessman, CEO of AMD
 Hipólito Ruiz López (1754–1816), Spanish botanist
 Iñaki Ruiz de Pinedo (born 1954), Spanish politician
 Israel Ruiz Jr. (born 1943), New York politician
 Iván Ruiz (born 1977), Cuban volleyball player 
 John Ruiz a.k.a. "The Quiet Man" (born 1972), Puerto Rican boxing champion
 José Francisco Ruiz (1795–1840), Texas revolutionary and politician
 José Martínez Ruiz, pseudonym Azorin (1873–1967), Spanish poet and writer
 José Javier Pomés Ruiz (born 1952), Spanish politician and Member of the European Parliament
 José Ruiz (baseball) (born 1994), Venezuelan baseball player
 Juan Ruiz (1283–1350), Spanish priest and poet
 Juan Ruiz de Alarcón (1581–1639), dramatist from New Spain
 Katie Ruiz (born 1984), American artist 
 Keibert Ruiz (born 1998), Venezuelan baseball player
 Lorenzo Ruiz (c. 1600–1637), Filipino saint
 Marcel Ruiz (born 2000), Mexican professional footballer
 Marcel Ruiz (actor) (born 2003), American actor
 Mari-Jo P. Ruiz, Filipina mathematician
 Maria Luisa Alanis Ruiz (born 1948), American academic and activist
 Martha Cecilia Ruiz (born 1972), Nicaraguan poet, writer, journalist and activist 
 Don Miguel Ruiz (born 1952), Mexican author, shaman, and teacher of the Toltec tradition
 Norge Ruiz (born 1994), Cuban baseball player
 Óscar Ruiz (referee) (born 1969), Colombian football referee
 Pablo Ruiz y Picasso (1881–1973), Spanish painter, sculptor, printmaker, ceramicist, stage designer, poet and playwright
 Raúl Ruiz (disambiguation), several people
 Renata Ruiz (born 1984), Chilean model, 2005 Miss Universe contestant
 Renato Ruiz (born 1977), Mexican professional wrestler
 Rio Ruiz (born 1994), American professional baseball player
 Rodrigo Ruiz (born 1972), Chilean football player
 Rosie Ruiz (1953–2019), woman who finished first in the 1980 Boston Marathon but was later found to have cheated by jumping in during the middle of the race
 Samuel Ruiz (1924–2011), Mexican bishop from the state of Chiapas
 Tracie Ruiz (born 1963), American synchronized swimmer
Vincenzo Arangio-Ruiz (1884–1964), Italian politician

Places 
 Nevado del Ruiz, volcano in Colombia
 Ruiz, Nayarit, in Mexico

References 

Surnames of Colombian origin
Patronymic surnames
Spanish-language surnames
Surnames from given names